Craig Fox may refer to:

Craig Fox (musician) (born 1975), American musician
Craig Fox (radio host), radio host and owner of radio stations